The following list of military aircraft of the Czech Republic is a list of military aircraft and civil aircraft for military use currently in service with the Czech Air Force, the Czech Land Forces (unmanned aerial vehicles) and the Flight Training Center as well as retired aircraft.

Current aircraft

Czech Air Force

|-
| Aero L-39ZA Albatros || Czechoslovakia || Jet || Trainer || 1989 || 3 || 9 || 
|-
| Aero L-159A ALCA || Czech Republic || Jet || Attack || 2000 || 16 || 72 || 
|-
| Aero L-159T1 || Czech Republic || Jet || Trainer || 2007 || 5 || 5 || 
|- 
| Aero L-159T2 || Czech Republic || Jet || Trainer || 2019 || 3 || 3 ||
|-
| Airbus A319CJ || Germany || Jet || Transport || 2006 || 2 || 2 || 
|-
| Bombardier Challenger CL-601 || Canada || Jet || Transport || 1992 || 1 || 1 || 
|-
| CASA C-295M || Spain || Propeller || Transport || 2010 || 6 || 6 || 
|-
| Let L-410 Turbolet || Czechoslovakia || Propeller || Transport || 1989 || 4 || 6 || 
|-
| Let L-410FG || Czechoslovakia || Propeller || Patrol || 1985 || 2 || 2 || 
|-
| Mil Mi-24 V/Mi-35 || USSR/Russia || Rotorcraft || attack || 2004 || 17(11) || 17 || Some donated to Ukraine but czech army have still probably 11  helicopters
|-
| Mil Mi-8 || USSR || Rotorcraft || Transport || 1984 || 3 || 18 || 
|-
| Mil Mi-17 || USSR || Rotorcraft || Transport || 1989 || 5 || 28 || 
|-
| Mil Mi-171Sh || Russia || Rotorcraft || Transport || 2004 || 15 || 16 || 
|-
| PZL W-3 Sokół || Poland || Rotorcraft || Utility || 1995 || 10 || 11 || 
|-
| Saab JAS 39 Gripen || Sweden || Jet || Multi-role || 2005 || 14 || 14 || 
|}

Flight Training Center

Flight Training Center (CLV)  in Pardubice is not a part of the Air Force. Primary flight training was outsourced as of 1 April 2004. CLV is a branch of LOM PRAHA s.p., state owned company.

|-
| Aero L-39C Albatros || Czechoslovakia || Jet || Trainer || 1972 || 7 ||  || 
|-
| Evektor-Aerotechnik EV-97 || Czech Republic || Propeller || Trainer ||  || 1 ||  || 
|-
| Let L-410 Turbolet || Czechoslovakia || Propeller || Transport ||  || 2 ||  || 
|-
| Mil Mi-2 || Poland || Rotorcraft || Utility || 1982 || 2 ||  || 
|-
| Mil Mi-17 || USSR || Rotorcraft || Transport || 1985 || 6 ||  || 
|-
| Zlín Z-43 || Czech Republic || Propeller || Trainer ||  || 1 ||  || 
|-
| Zlín Z-142 || Czech Republic || Propeller || Trainer || 1992 || 9 ||  || 
|}

Czech Land Forces

Unmanned aerial vehicles of the Czech Army are used mainly by the Unmanned Reconnaissance Aerial Vehicle Company of the 102nd Reconnaissance Battalion with one "Scan Eagle Group" and four "RQ-11B Raven Sections" ready for deployment (as of 2017).

|-
| Elbit Skylark || Israel || UAV || Reconnaissance || 2009 || 2 || || Acquired for overseas deployment.
|-
| RQ-11B Raven || United States || UAV || Reconnaissance || || 6 ||  || 
|-
| Scan Eagle || United States|| UAV || Reconnaissance || || 10 || || 
|-
| Wasp III || United States || UAV || Reconnaissance || 2010 || || || Acquired for ISTAR and FAC units.
|-
| RQ-20 Puma || United States || UAV || Reconnaissance || 2008 || || || One system RQ-20A Puma was purchased in 2018. In 2022 was purchased four systems Puma 3 AE.
|}

Retired aircraft

Czech Air Force

|-
| Antonov An-12BP || USSR || Propeller || Transport || 1981 || 1994 || 1 || Introduced in 1964 in USSR.
|-
| Antonov An-26 || USSR || Propeller || Transport || 1982 || 2011 || 4 || 
|-
| Tupolev Tu-134A || USSR || Jet || Transport || 1971 || 1996 || 1 || 
|-
| Tupolev Tu-154M || USSR || Jet || Transport || 1998 || 2007 || 2 || 
|-
| Aero L-29 Delfin || Czechoslovakia || Jet|| Trainer || 1963 || 2003 || 32 || 
|-
| Antonov An-30 || USSR || Propeller || Patrol || 1988 || 2003 || 1 || 
|-
| Mil Mi-2 || USSR || Rotorcraft || Utility || 1981 || 2004 || 38 || 
|-
| Mil Mi-24D || Russia || Rotorcraft || Attack || 1978 || 2022 || 12 || Donated to Ukraine
|-
| MiG-21MF || USSR || Jet || Fighter || 1971 || 2005 || 72 || 
|-
| MiG-21UM || USSR || Jet || Fighter/Trainer || 1972 || 2005 || 22 || 
|-
| MiG-23BN || USSR || Jet || Fighter-bomber || 1977 || 1994 || 32 || 
|-
| MiG-23MF || USSR || Jet || Fighter || 1978 || 1994 || 13 || 
|-
| MiG-23ML || USSR || Jet || Fighter || 1981 || 1998 || 17 || 
|-
| MiG-23UM || USSR || Jet || Fighter/Trainer || 1978 || 1998 || 8 || 
|-
| MiG-29A || USSR || Jet || Fighter || 1989 || 1995 || 9 || 
|-
| MiG-29UB || USSR || Jet || Fighter/Trainer || 1989 || 1995 || 1 || 
|-
| Sukhoi Su-22 || USSR || Jet || Fighter-bomber || 1984 || 2002 || 37 || 56 as of 1990; Slovakia received 19 in 1993.
|-
| Sukhoi Su-25 || USSR || Jet || Attack || 1984 || 2000 || 25 ||
|-
| Yak-40 || USSR || Jet || Transport  || 1972 || 2020 || 2 ||
|-
| Antonov An-24V || USSR || Propeller || Transport || 1967 || 2005 || 4 || 
|}

Czech Land Forces

|-
| Sojka III || Czech Republic || UAV || Reconnaissance || || 2011 || || 
|}

See also
Military of the Czech Republic

References

External links
Czech Air Force

Czech Active Military Aircraft

Czech military-related lists